Anthony Laffranchi (born 16 November 1980) is a former professional rugby league footballer. An Australia and Italy international, and New South Wales State of Origin representative forward, he played in the National Rugby League for the Wests Tigers (with whom he won the 2005 NRL premiership) and the Gold Coast Titans, and for Super League club St Helens.

Background
Laffranchi was born in Murwillumbah, New South Wales, Australia. He attended Mt St Patrick's College and played early football for the Murwillumbah Colts. He is of Italian descent and was eligible to represent the Italy national rugby league team.

Playing career

Wests Tigers
Laffranchi played at prop forward in the Tigers' 2005 NRL Grand Final victory over the North Queensland Cowboys. As NRL Premiers Wests faced Super League champions Bradford Bulls in the 2006 World Club Challenge. Laffranchi played at second-row forward in the Tigers' 30–10 loss.

Gold Coast Titans
At the end of the Titans' first season Laffranchi was named co-winner of the club's inaugural Paul Broughton Medal for best and fairest player of the season with teammate Luke Bailey. After further solid performance in 2008, he was selected to play for the City vs Country Origin game, representing Country, in which he was awarded Man of the Match.

Laffranchi was named as the 18th man for the Australians for the Centenary Rugby League Test against New Zealand in 2008.

Laffranchi was selected for New South Wales in game I of the 2008 State of origin series. Laffranchi started from the bench and scored the winning try off a Mark Gasnier line break and lead the tackle count (40) for the Blues.

In August 2008, Laffranchi was named in the preliminary 46-man Kangaroos squad for the 2008 Rugby League World Cup, and in October 2008 he was selected in the final 24-man Australia squad.

He followed this up with a two try effort in Australia's second match of the World Cup. He was selected for Australia in the one-off test match against New Zealand on 8 May 2009. He was also an Italian international.

Laffranchi signed a two-year deal with St. Helens starting in 2012.

St Helens
Laffranchi commenced his Super League career in the 2012 season with St. Helens.He played for the Exiles in the International Origin and also represented Italy in the 2013 Rugby League World Cup.

Highlights
Junior club: Murwillumbah Colts
First-grade debut: Round 26, Wests Tigers v Sharks at Leichhardt Oval, 2 September 2001
First-grade record:  116 appearances scoring 22 tries (Total: 88 points)
First-grade clubs:  102 appearances for Wests Tigers (18 tries, 72 points) 2001–2006, 30 appearances for Gold Coast Titans (11 tries, 44 points) 2007, 2008
Representative teams:  NSW Blues (State of Origin), 2008 (1 try, 4 points), City Country Match 2006 (1 try, 4 points)

References

External links
Saints Heritage Society profile
Gold Coast Titans profile
Gold Coast profile
Anthony Laffranchi NRL Profile

1980 births
Living people
Australian rugby league players
Australian people of Italian descent
Australia national rugby league team players
Country New South Wales Origin rugby league team players
Exiles rugby league team players
Gold Coast Titans players
Italy national rugby league team players
New South Wales Rugby League State of Origin players
Rugby league props
Rugby league second-rows
People from the Northern Rivers
Rugby league players from Murwillumbah
St Helens R.F.C. players
Wests Tigers players